Voľa is a village and municipality in Michalovce District in the Kosice Region of eastern Slovakia.

History
In historical records the village was first mentioned in 1357.

Geography
The village lies at an altitude of 127 metres and covers an area of 5.782 km². The municipality has a population of about 250 people.

Voľa neighbours Nacina Ves to the south and the town of Strážske to the north. To the west of the main village lies the small hamlet of Vybuchanec, the only other settled place in the Voľa municipality.

Transport
Voľa lies on the main road and near the main railway line between Michalovce and Humenné.

The village is serviced by regular bus lines on the main road. The nearest large train station is in Strážske and a smaller one in Nacina Ves.

Gallery

External links

 Statistics: Mosmis (Slovak Republic)

Villages and municipalities in Michalovce District